Annie and the Old One is an American children's fictional book, written by Miska Miles. It was first published in 1971, illustrated by Peter Parnall. In 1972 the book received the Newbery Medal Honor Book award. The novel uses Native American culture to explore themes of family death, dealing with grief, and the family relationships.

Plot

A young Native American girl, Annie, is willing to do anything to stop her mother from finishing a rug after hearing from her grandmother that she will die when the rug is finished. Annie misbehaves in school to make her parents come speak to the teacher, but the teacher does not call for her mother. Then, Annie let the sheep escape, so her mother and father would spend the morning chasing after the sheep. Her last attempt to distract her mother from finishing the rug is pulling out the strands of yarn, one by one .

Characters
 Annie --A young girl who is willing to stop her mother from finishing the rug.
 GrandMother-- Annie's grandmother, who is soon about to pass away.
 Mother--Annie's mother
 Father--Annie's father

Teaching and themes 
The novel focuses on dealing with death, the grief that comes with family death, and family relationships. Teaching resources recommend using the book to teach elementary children how to deal with grief and managing feelings.

Reception 
Publishers Weekly described the book effectively dealing with "a difficult challenge" for children and that the illustrations "reflect the dignity of the text."

References 

1971 American novels
American children's novels
Navajo culture
Newbery Honor-winning works
1971 children's books
American picture books